Chamaelycus is a genus of snakes, commonly referred to as banded snakes, in the family Lamprophiidae. The genus is endemic to Central Africa.

Species
The following three species are recognized as being valid.
Chamaelycus christyi Boulenger, 1919 – Christy's banded snake
Chamaelycus fasciatus (Günther, 1858) – African banded snake
Chamaelycus parkeri (Angel, 1934) – Parker's banded snake

Nota bene: A binomial authority in parentheses indicates that the species was originally described in a genus other than Chamaelycus.

Taxonomy
The species formerly known as Chamaelycus werneri , is considered to be a synonym of C. fasciatus.

Etymology
The specific names, christyi, parkeri, and werneri, are in honor of Drs. Cuthbert Christy, Hampton Wildman Parker, and Franz Werner, respectively.

References

Further reading
Boulenger GA (1919). "Batraciens et reptiles recueillis par le Dr. C. Christy au Congo Belge dans les districts de Stanleyville, Haute-Uelé et Ituri en 1912-1914 ". Revue Zoologique Africaine, Bruxelles 7 (1): 1-29. ("Chamælycus", new genus, p. 22). (in French).

Lamprophiidae
Snake genera
Taxa named by George Albert Boulenger